The Twelve-Factor App methodology is a methodology for building software-as-a-service applications.  These best practices are designed to enable applications to be built with portability and resilience when deployed to the web.

History 
The methodology was drafted by developers at Heroku, a platform-as-a-service company, and was first presented by Adam Wiggins circa 2011.

The Twelve Factors

Criticism and adaptation 
A Nginx architect argued that the relevance of the Twelve-Factor app concept is somewhat specific to Heroku, while introducing their own (Nginx's) proposed architecture for microservices. The twelve factors are however cited as a baseline from which to adapt or extend.

References

External links 
 12factor Website
 The Twelve-Factor App epub book by Adam Wiggins

Architectural pattern (computer science)
Software delivery methods
Cloud computing